Let's Dance (in English) is the Slovak version of Dancing with the Stars. Eight seasons were broadcast by TV Markiza (1st in the autumn of 2006), hosted by Adela Vinczeová and Martin "Pyco" Rausch (both of them also hosted the program Slovensko hľadá SuperStar (Slovak version of Pop Idol) on STV in 2005 and 2006). The winners of 1st season were Zuzana Fialová (a noted Slovak actress) and Peter Modrovský (a professional dancer). The winners of 2nd season were Michaela Čobejová (Slovak actress) and Tomáš Surovec (a professional dancer). The winners of 3rd season were Juraj Mokrý (Slovak actor and humorist) and Katarína Štumpfová (a professional dancer). The winners of 4th season were Nela Pocisková (Slovak actress and singer) and Peter Modrovský (a professional dancer). The winners of 5th season were Janka Hospodárová (Slovak TV presenter) and Matej Chren (a professional dancer). The winners of 6th season were Vladimír Kobielsky (Slovak actor) and Dominika Chrapeková (professional dancer). The winners of 7th season were Ján Koleník (Slovak actor) and Vanda Poláková (professional dancer).

Presenters & Judges 
Table of presenters of Let's Dance:

 PRESENTER OF Let's Dance    CONTESTANT OF Let's Dance    JUDGING PANEL

Table of judges of Let's Dance:

 JUDGING PANEL    PRESENTER OF Let's Dance    CONTESTANT OF Let's Dance    GUEST JUDGE(S)

Professional dancers & their partners 

Key:
 Winner of the series
 Second place of the series
 Third place of the series
 First elimination of the series
 Withdrew in the series
 Elimination of the series (2nd to last)
Unclassified

Series overview

Season 1 - 2006
The ten couples featuring selected celebrities and their dancing partners:

Season 2 - 2008
The ten couples featuring selected celebrities and their dancing partners:

Season 3 - 2009
The ten couples featuring selected celebrities and their dancing partners:

Season 4 - 2010
The eleven couples featuring selected celebrities and their dancing partners:

Season 5 - 2011
The twelve couples featuring selected celebrities and their dancing partners:

Season 6 - 2017 
The eleven couples featuring selected celebrities and their dancing partners:

Season 7 - 2022 
The eleven couples featuring selected celebrities and their dancing partners:

Scoring chart

Week 1 (6 March) 

 Group Performance: "I Wanna Dance With Somebody" – Whitney Houston
 On the first live show, no elimination took place, therefore all couples advanced to Week 2.

Week 2 (13 March) 

 Judge's scores from last week were added up to this week's scores. Then, they were put together with the audience's votes and the couple with the least overall points was eliminated.

Week 3 (20 March) 

 Theme: Movies
 The couple with the least overall points (judges' scores combined with the audience votes) was eliminated.

Week 4 (27 March) 

 Group performance: "What a Feeling" - Alex Gaudino

Week 5 (3 April) 

 Group performance: "Libertango"
 This week featured group salsa battles. Scores from the dance were added up to each couple's individual scores and from this, the judge's leaderboard was formed.
 Due to testing positive for COVID 19, Michal Kovačič's partner Simona Brecíková was replaced by Fero Joke's former partner Vanesa Indrová.

Week 6 (10 April) 

 Theme: Carnival
 Group performance: "Que Calor"/"Real in Rio"
 Each couple performed the same dance, samba.
 This week featured the dance marathon - bachata.

Week 7 (17 April) 

 Group performance: "Goral" - Slavonix
 Special performance: TECHNIK - STU
 This week featured group folk dance. Scores from the dance were added up to each couple's individual scores and from this, the judges's final scoreboard was formed.

Week 8 (24 April) 

 Guest performance: "Moving On" – ADONXS
 For the first time this series, each couple performed two individual dances.

Week 9: Semi-final (1 May) 

 Guest performance: Cigánski diabli and Slovenské divadlo tanca
 This evening featured the dance-off for the first time. Two couples with the lowest overall points went head-to-head in the dance-off. The judges then picked the final couple to make it to the Top 3.

Final (8 May) 

 Opening performance: Class of 2022; "Let's Go" – Tiësto
 The remaining couples each performed 3 dances, one chosen by the judges, one of which they've previously performed and a freestyle.
 The winner was chosen by audience's votes only. The judges' scores were for guidance only.

Season 8 - 2023 
The twelve couples featuring selected celebrities and their dancing partners:

Scoring chart

Week 1 (5 March) 

 Group performance: "Intoxicated" - Martin Solveig and GTA
 Emma Drobná performed the song "Bohemian Rhapsody" as a part of Helena Krajčiová & Fabio Belucci's waltz.
 On the first live show, no elimination took place, therefore all couples advanced to Week 2.

Week 2 (12 March) 

 Judges' scores from week 1 were added to this week's scores. They were then combined with the audience's votes and the couple with the least overall points was eliminated.
 Mária Čírová suffered an injury, therefore she was unable to perform. According to the rules, together with her partner, they were given a bye to the following week.

Week 3 (19 March) 

 Theme: Movies
 Due to testing positive for COVID-19, Mario Cimarro's partner Vanda Poláková was permanently replaced by Vanesa Indrová.
 Mária Čírová withdrew from the competition on March 17, 2023, due to an injury, which she sustained a week before.
 Vratko Sirági joined the competition as a replacement for Mária Čírová together with his partner Anna Riebauerová. They were granted immunity and didn't face the elimination as well as the judges' scores, therefore they automatically advanced to Week 4.

Week 4 (26 March) 

 Theme: Love

References

External links
 Official website Let's Dance

 
2006 Slovak television series debuts
Dance competition television shows
2000s Slovak television series
Slovak reality television series
Slovak music television series
Slovak television series based on British television series
Markíza original programming